Marie A. DiBerardino (or Di Berardino) (May 2, 1926 – July 14, 2013, Haverford, Pennsylvania) was an American biologist, specializing in developmental biology and genetics. She is known, with Robert William Briggs and Thomas Joseph King, as a pioneer in amphibian cloning.

Education and career
After graduating from West Philadelphia Catholic Girls High School in 1944, Marie DiBerardino matriculated at Chestnut Hill College, graduating there in 1948 with a B.S. in biology. During the 1950s she was a staff member at the Women's Medical College of Pennsylvania. She became a professor of anatomy at the Women's Medical College of Pennsylvania (which was renamed in 1970 the Medical College of Pennsylvania, merged in 1993 into the Hahnemann Medical School, and absorbed in 2003 into the Drexel University College of Medicine). She graduated in 1962 from the University of Pennsylvania with a Ph.D. in development and genetics. She became a professor of physiology and biochemistry at the Medical College of Pennsylvania and in retirement was professor emerita of the Drexel University College of Medicine. For many years she did research at Philadelphia's Institute for Cancer Research (which in 1974 was merged into the Fox Chase Cancer Center).

In 1967 DiBerardino and Thomas J. King published the important result that "nuclear transplantation from gastrulae and later stages often resulted in chromosome damage, whereas nuclei from blastula cells were damaged a great deal less. This, in turn, can be attributed to the slowing cell cycle as cells differentiate and to other changes undergone as cells progress toward a specialized state."

DiBerardino was elected in 1976 a Fellow of the American Association for the Advancement of Science. She received the Jean Brachet Memorial Award of the International Society of Developmental Biology (now called the International Society of Differentiation) and gave the 1996 Jean Brachet Memorial Lecture.

She was the co-editor, with Laurence D. Etkin, of Genomic Adaptability in Somatic Cell Specialization

Selected publications

References

1926 births
2013 deaths
American women biologists
Fellows of the American Academy of Arts and Sciences
Chestnut Hill College alumni
University of Pennsylvania alumni
Drexel University faculty
Scientists from Philadelphia
American physiologists
Women physiologists
20th-century American women scientists
21st-century American women scientists
American women academics
Fox Chase Cancer Center people